The Venezuelan mountain skink (Orosaura nebulosylvestris) is a reptile, a member of the skink family, Scincidae. It is monotypic in the genus Orosaura.

Range and distribution 
They are distributed throughout the highlands of the Venezuelan coastal range and the Andean Cordillerea of Mérida. The species is found in open areas at the edges of cloud forest, shrubby vegetation of subparamos, and rural gardens.

Anatomy 
This genus is characterized by two or four frontoparietal (rarely five or six), one row of nuchals, 48-56 dorsals, 27-38 ventrals, (these counts where by different methods, dorsolateral stripes, a dark lateral stripe, and dark ventral striping. Orosaura has what appears to be a pair of irregular, dark nape stripes or lines of spots immediately adjacent to the pale dorsolateral stripes. The maximum body size for this species is 97 mm. This species is less prone to decline due to their relatively wide range.

References

External links 
 
 

Skinks
Reptiles described in 2009
Taxa named by Aurélien Miralles
Taxa named by Gilson Rivas
Taxa named by Celine Bonillo
Taxa named by Walter E. Schargel
Taxa named by Tito Barros
Taxa named by Juan Elías García-Pérez
Taxa named by Cesar L. Barrio-Amoros